Danny Coralles is one of the current guitarists in the band Autopsy and was  co-founder with drummer Chris Reifert of Abscess. Autopsy is back again and have been so since 2009 which is currently producing new material and is actively playing selected venues throughout the world. Danny, prior to forming Abscess along with Reifert have been continuous bandmates then and now in Autopsy as well as collaborations with Frank "Killjoy" Pucci  in the now defunct supergroup The Ravenous, and separate side projects, Eat My Fuk and Doomed.

Autopsy
Danny Coralles is the guitarist for the band credited for originating grindcore, Autopsy.

Danny has a signature Autopsy guitar 1 of 2 created by IKON Customs appropriately named "Twisted Mass" pictured.

Discography
 Critical Madness (Demo, 1988)
 Severed Survival (LP, Peaceville Records), 1989)
 Retribution for the Dead (EP, Peaceville Records, 1991)
 Fiend for Blood (EP, Peaceville Records, 1991)
 Mental Funeral (LP, Peaceville Records, 1992)
 Acts of the Unspeakable (LP, Peaceville Records, 1992)
 Shitfun (LP, Peaceville Records, 1995)
 Torn from the Grave (Compilation, Peaceville Records, 2001)
 Dead as Fuck (Live, Necroharmonic Productions, 2004)

The Ravenous
After the break-up of Autopsy Coralles and Reifert joined the death metal supergroup The Ravenous.

Discography
Assembled in Blasphemy (Hammerheart Records, 2000)

Abscess
Coralles was the guitarist for the punk-influenced death metal band Abscess. Abscess disbanded in 2010.

Sources

Death metal musicians
Living people
American heavy metal guitarists
American male guitarists
Year of birth missing (living people)